Le Crazy Horse Saloon or Le Crazy Horse de Paris is a Parisian cabaret known for its stage shows performed by nude female dancers and for the diverse range of magic and variety 'turns' between each nude show and the next. Its owners have helped to create related cabaret and burlesque shows in other cities. Unrelated businesses have used the phrase "Crazy Horse" in their names.

History

The Paris Crazy Horse occupies former wine cellars (12 in all, which have been combined) of an impressive Haussmanian building at 12 Avenue George-V (from the British king George V, in French "George Cinq").

Alain Bernardin opened it in 1951 and personally operated it for decades until his death by suicide in 1994. Many of the original waiters (their names stitched in large letters onto the backs of their waistcoats) were also substantial shareholders in the original company. The enterprise remained a family business, in the hands of Bernardin's three children, until 2005, when it changed hands. By this time the name "Le Crazy Horse de Paris" was used for the original venue and Crazy Horse Paris for one in Las Vegas (formerly La Femme) at the MGM Grand.

Along with its dancers, the Crazy Horse has also been a popular venue for many other artists, including magicians, jugglers, and mimes. Bernardin explained that he loved magic because it corresponded with his vision: "[Magic] is a dream.  There is no show that is more dreamlike than a magic show.  And what we do with the girls is magic, too, because they aren't as beautiful as you see them onstage.  It's the magic of lights and costumes.  These are my dreams and fascinations that I put onstage."

Under new shareholders and new management from 2005, Crazy Horse started featuring famous or prestigious artists stripping for a limited number of shows, including Dita Von Teese, Carmen Electra, Aria Cascaval, Arielle Dombasle or Pamela Anderson. They also hired Philippe Decouflé as choreographer. Kelly Brook appeared in the autumn of 2012. Also in 2012, the dancers went on strike for higher pay. Before the strike, which caused the cancellation of a high-profile revue for one day but generated a fantastic buzz for the cabaret, some sources mentioned a salary of €2,000 per month. Other sources said that settlement of the strike yielded a 15 percent pay raise. These numbers were denied by the management of the cabaret.

The Paradiso Girls have named their album Crazy Horse after the club, as one of their members Aria Cascaval worked there. The club is referenced in the song "Live with Me" by The Rolling Stones in 1969, and also mentioned in the 1987 Mötley Crüe song "Girls, Girls, Girls".

Film history 
In 1977, the club created and appeared in a documentary film, known as Crazy-Horse, Paris-France, or Crazy Horse de Paris.
Crazy Horse-Le Show: a 2004 documentary in DVD format.
Crazy Horse, Paris: a 2009 documentary in DVD format. The video features a Neo-Burlesque performer Dita von Teese.
Crazy Horse: a 2011 documentary by Frederick Wiseman.
Beyoncé's music video for 'Partition' was inspired by, and partially filmed at Crazy Horse. The video is part of her 2013 self-titled 'visual album.'

Public transit access
 Alma – Marceau  
 Champs-Élysées – Clemenceau

Other clubs

Other entertainments with varying degrees of resemblance and similar names, but unaffiliated with the original, include:
The Crazy Horse, Beirut, Lebanon
Crazy Horse Too, Las Vegas 
Crazy Horse, Orlando, Florida
Crazy Horse, Myrtle Beach, South Carolina
Crazy Horse Gentlemen's Club, San Francisco
Crazy Horse, Adelaide, Australia
Crazy Horse, Gold Coast, Australia
Crazy Horse, Winston-Salem, North Carolina
Crazy Horse, Akron, Ohio
Crazy Horse, Cleveland, Ohio
Crazy Horse, Bedford Heights, Ohio
Crazy Horse, Kaohsiung, Taiwan
Crazy Horse Cabaret, Bronx, New York

See also

 Peepshow
 Sirens of TI
 Absinthe
 Moulin Rouge
 Le Lido
 List of strip clubs
 Folies Bergère
 Casino de Paris
 Paradis Latin
 Cabaret Red Light
 Tropicana Club
 Jubilee!

References

External links

 Crazy Horse official website
 Facade of Paris Crazy Horse
 History of Crazy Horse and La Femme
 Review of the documentary
 Mention of Alain Bernardin et Compagnie v. Pavilion Properties Ltd  suit

Cabarets in Paris
Strip clubs in France
Buildings and structures in the 8th arrondissement of Paris
1951 establishments in France
Burlesque theatres